The Racine Journal Times (since 1972 officially styled The Journal Times) is an American daily newspaper published in Racine, Wisconsin. The paper serves the entire Racine County area.

History 
The Journal Times traces its roots to the 1852 foundation of the Racine Weekly Journal, which became a daily in 1856. The Journal was sold during the American Civil War to former state senator and commanding officer of the 22nd Wisconsin Volunteer Infantry (the "Abolition Regiment")  William L. Utley. Utley and his family published the paper for some time, but by 1875 had sold it to Frank Starbuck, son of the publisher of The Times of Cincinnati, who had been serving as co-publisher since 1873.

In 1912, the name was changed to the Racine Journal News. The newspaper's former radio station, WRJN, was founded in December 1926. Starbuck died in 1929, his son, Frank R. Starbuck, became publisher, and in 1932 the paper merged with the Racine Times-Call, the other local daily, to become the Journal Times. The paper was sold to Lee Enterprises in 1968, and in 1972 officially changed its name to simply The Journal Times.

On July 14th 2019, The Journal Times shut down its press, and the paper is now printed in Munster, Indiana.

As of 2022, the newspapers continues to print daily editions.

References 

1852 establishments in Wisconsin
Daily newspapers published in the United States
Racine, Wisconsin
Newspapers published in Wisconsin
Publications established in 1852
Lee Enterprises publications